Sreekrishnapuram VT Bhattathiripad College, is a general degree college located in Sreekrishnapuram, Palakkad district, Kerala. It was established in the year 1982. The college is affiliated with Calicut University. This college offers different courses in arts, commerce and science.

 courses
 Bsc.mathematicsBA.Economics BA.Sanskrit  BA.History BCom BBA Msc.computer science MCom

Accreditation
The college is  recognized by the University Grants Commission (UGC).

References

External links
http://www.vtb.ac.in

Universities and colleges in Palakkad district
Educational institutions established in 1982
1982 establishments in Kerala
Arts and Science colleges in Kerala
Colleges affiliated with the University of Calicut